Damond Powell Jr. (born October 31, 1992) is an American football wide receiver who currently plays for the Sioux Falls Storm of the IFL. He was signed as an undrafted free agent by the  Arizona Cardinals after the 2015 NFL Draft. He played  college football at Iowa.

Professional career

Arizona Cardinals 
On May 5, 2015, Powell signed to the Arizona Cardinals as an undrafted free agent On July 29, 2015, Powell was placed on the reserve/non football injury list after being shot in the face. On March 10, 2016, he was released.

Cedar Rapids Titans 
On January 31, 2017, Powell signed with the Cedar Rapids Titans of the Indoor Football League. Powell was named First Team All-Indoor Football League at the conclusion of the 2017 season.

Sioux Falls Storm 

On May 29, 2018, Powell signed with the Sioux Falls Storm of the Indoor Football League. After his stint with the Sioux Falls Storm he got signed to the practice squad of the Montreal Alouettes of the Canadian Football League.

Tucson Sugar Skulls 

On July 27  2021, Powell signed with the Tucson Sugar Skulls of the Indoor Football League.

Personal life 
On July 25, 2015, Powell was wounded by gunfire outside his Ohio home and was hospitalized. He was shot in the jaw and the neck.

References 

1992 births
Living people
American football wide receivers
Iowa Hawkeyes football players
Cedar Rapids River Kings players
Sportspeople from Toledo, Ohio
Snow Badgers football players